Michael Billington may refer to:

 Michael Billington (actor) (1941–2005), British film and television actor
 Michael Billington (critic) (born 1939), drama critic of The Guardian
 Michael Billington (activist), author and activist in the LaRouche movement